Joseph Pare (born 30 December 1943) is a former French cyclist. He competed in the team pursuit at the 1964 Summer Olympics.

References

1943 births
Living people
French male cyclists
Olympic cyclists of France
Cyclists at the 1964 Summer Olympics
French track cyclists